The Western America Railroad Museum is a railroad museum located in Barstow, California.

The museum collects, preserves and shares the history of railroading in the Pacific Southwest.  It is located on the east side of the Harvey House Railroad Depot and is operated by a non-profit organization.

It houses displays inside the depot and has displays such as railroad artifacts, artwork, timetables, uniforms, tools and various other types of railroad memorabilia.

There are also outdoor displays of rolling stock, locomotives and general railroad operating equipment such as Atchison, Topeka and Santa Fe Railway (ATSF) #1460, also known as the “Beep”, Union Pacific EMD SD40-2 #9950, and ATSF's FP45 #95.

External Displays 
The Western America Railroad Museum offers a multitude of static displays for rail-fans of all ages to climb on and experience the sheer mass of the rolling stock. The museum offers the following right outside its doors:

(In Clockwise Order Facing East)

 ATSF 999782 (Caboose)
 UP 25599 (Caboose)
 Unidentifiable Pullman-Style Baggage Car
 Unidentifiable USMC "Yard Work" Locomotive
 ATSF 95 (Locomotive)
 UP 9950 (Locomotive)
 ATSF 1460 (Locomotive)
 Arizona & California Railroad #58 Pullman Car (Passanger Car)

And many more!

References

External links

Museums in San Bernardino County, California
Railroad museums in California
Barstow, California
Mojave Desert
2001 establishments in California
Museums established in 2001

